Marcel Welter (7 January 1924 – 25 July 2009) was a Luxembourgian footballer. He played in four matches for the Luxembourg national football team from 1950 to 1952. He was also part of Luxembourg's squad for the football tournament at the 1948 Summer Olympics, but he did not play in any matches.

References

External links
 
 

1924 births
2009 deaths
Luxembourgian footballers
Luxembourg international footballers
People from Pétange
Association football forwards
CS Pétange players